Jacinto Angulo Pardo is a Cuban politician and the Cuban Minister of Internal Trade (2009–Present). He was appointed in 2009 shake-up by Raúl Castro. Mr Angulo has a master's degree in International Relations and is an industrial engineer.  Since 2006, he had been the first Vice-President of Domestic Trade.

References
 The Miami Herald, "Cuban Economy: Purge Aims to Halt Cuba's Economic Free Fall", Sunday March 8, 2009, Page 1A.

External links
https://web.archive.org/web/20071011123545/http://wtopnews.com/?nid=105
https://abcnews.go.com/International/wireStory?id=6992631
https://www.reuters.com/article/worldNews/idUSTRE52868R20090309
https://web.archive.org/web/20090401152243/http://www.periodico26.cu/english/news_cuba/mar2009/official-note030209.html
https://web.archive.org/web/20090101182936/http://www.embacubalebanon.com/cur_min1.html

Year of birth missing (living people)
Government ministers of Cuba
Living people
Communist Party of Cuba politicians